The 2000 WTA Madrid Open (also known as the Open de España Villa de Madrid or Trofeo Volkswagen for sponsorship reasons) was a professional women's tennis tournament played on outdoor clay courts at the Club de Campo Villa de Madrid in Madrid, Spain from 22–27 May 2000. It was the fifth edition of the event on the WTA Tour. It was classified as a Tier III event on the 2000 WTA Tour.

Points and prize money

Point distribution

Prize money

Singles main draw entrants

Seeds

1: Rankings are as of May 15, 2000.

Other entrants
The following players received wildcards into the main draw:
  Iva Majoli
  Virginia Ruano Pascual

The following players received entry from the qualifying draw:
  Lourdes Domínguez Lino
  Germana Di Natale
  Anabel Medina Garrigues
  Gisela Riera

The following player received entry as a lucky loser:
  Samantha Reeves

Retirements
  Germana Di Natale
  Paola Suárez

Doubles main draw entrants

Seeds

1: Rankings are as of May 15, 2000.

Other entrants
The following pair received wildcards into the doubles main draw:
  Mariaan de Swardt /  Martina Navratilova

The following pair received entry as alternates:
  Ana Salas Lozano /  Elena Salvador

Withdrawals
Before the tournament
  Paula García /  Kelly Liggan →replaced by Ana Salas Lozano / Elena Salvador

During the tournament
  Henrieta Nagyova /  Magüi Serna
  Virginia Ruano Pascual /  Paola Suárez

Champions

Singles

  Gala León García defeated  Fabiola Zuluaga, 4–6, 6–2, 6–2

Doubles

  Lisa Raymond /  Rennae Stubbs defeated  Gala León García /  María Sánchez Lorenzo, 6–1, 6–3

External links
 Official Results Archive (ITF)
 Official Results Archive (WTA)